Aliabad-e Sofla (also Romanized as ‘Alīābād-e Soflá; also known as ‘Alīābād and ‘Alīābād-e Pā’īn) is a village in Aliabad Rural District, in the Central District of Hashtrud County, East Azerbaijan Province, Iran. At the 2006 census, its population was 546, in 126 families.

References 

Towns and villages in Hashtrud County